Dieter Wisliceny (13 January 1911 – 4 May 1948) was a member of the Schutzstaffel (SS) and one of the deputies of Adolf Eichmann, helping to organise and coordinate the wide scale deportations of the Jews across Europe during the Holocaust.

Crimes against humanity

Joining the Nazi Party in 1933 and enlisting in the SS in 1934, Wisliceny eventually rose to the rank of SS-Hauptsturmführer (captain) in 1940; he worked in the Reich Security Head Office Referat IV B4 under Adolf Eichmann. During implementation of the Final Solution, his task was the ghettoization and liquidation of several important Jewish communities in Nazi-occupied Europe, including those of Greece, Hungary and Slovakia. Wisliceny also re-introduced the yellow star in occupied countries; the yellow star being used to distinguish Jews from non-Jews. He was involved in the deportation of the Hungarian Jews in 1944.

Wisliceny was an important witness at the Nuremberg trials. His testimony would later prove important in the successful prosecution of Eichmann for his complicity in the Holocaust in Israel in 1961. 

Wisliceny was extradited to Czechoslovakia, where he was tried and hanged for war crimes in 1948.

References

External links 

 

1911 births
1948 deaths
People from Giżycko County
People from East Prussia
Nazi Party members
Holocaust perpetrators in Poland
Executed German people
SS-Hauptsturmführer
Nazis executed by Czechoslovakia by hanging
Nazis convicted of war crimes
Holocaust perpetrators in Ukraine
Holocaust perpetrators in Greece
Holocaust perpetrators in Slovakia
People extradited to Czechoslovakia
Reich Security Main Office personnel